Lewis Street is the third extended play from American rapper J. Cole. It was released on July 22, 2020, by Dreamville Records and Roc Nation. It contains the dual singles "The Climb Back" and "Lion King on Ice". The two singles were to serve as the first two tracks from one of Cole's upcoming albums The Fall Off. However, "The Climb Back" later was included on Cole's sixth studio album, The Off-Season.

Background
On July 20, 2020, J. Cole released an article he wrote for The Players' Tribune, writing about goals for his forthcoming album The Fall Off:

On July 21, Cole announced the release of two singles in a social media post, writing "First 2 songs from The Fall Off. Dropping tomorrow night 10pm. No date for the album yet, taking my time, still finishing."

Track listing
Credits and personnel adapted from Tidal.

References

J. Cole albums
Dreamville Records albums
Hip hop EPs
2020 EPs
Albums produced by J. Cole
Albums produced by T-Minus (record producer)
Albums produced by JetsonMade